James Kajiya is a pioneer in the field of computer graphics. He is perhaps best known for the development of the rendering equation.

Kajiya received his PhD from the University of Utah in 1979, was a professor at Caltech from 1979 through 1994, and is currently a researcher at Microsoft Research.

In 2002, Kajiya was elected a member of the National Academy of Engineering for contributions to formal and practical methods of computer image generation.

References

External links 
 Biography at Microsoft

Microsoft employees
University of Utah alumni
California Institute of Technology faculty
Computer graphics professionals
American computer scientists
Computer graphics researchers
Living people
Year of birth missing (living people)
Academy Award for Technical Achievement winners